Amparo West Serrano (born 17 April 1993; Mexico City, Mexico) artistically known as Minnie West is a Mexican television actress and producer. She is best known as actress for her role as Adriana Montes in the Telemundo's telenovela Eva la trailera. She also owns the Wetzer Films production company, along with Alejandro Speitzer, her ex-boyfriend.

Personal life 
Amparo West Serrano is the daughter of David West, American producer and president of Westwood Entertainment, and Amparín Serrano, Mexican designer.

Filmography

Awards and nominations

References

External links 
 

1993 births
Living people
Mexican film actresses
Mexican television actresses
21st-century Mexican actresses